Otto George Denning (December 28, 1912 – May 25, 1992) was an American professional baseball player and manager.  His 20-year (1932–51) career was confined to minor league baseball except for 129 games at the Major League level during the World War II manpower shortage for the 1942–43 Cleveland Indians.  He was a native of Hays, Kansas, and attended high school in Chicago, Illinois.

He began his pro baseball career in 1932 with the Davenport Blue Sox in the Class D Mississippi Valley League. In 1938, he joined the Minneapolis Millers of the top-level American Association and finished second to teammate Ted Williams in the league's batting race. He hit over .300 for Minneapolis for four consecutive seasons, then was selected by the Indians in the 1941 Rule 5 Draft.

Denning made his big-league debut on April 15, 1942 against the Detroit Tigers, and lashed two hits in four at bats, including a double, off Dizzy Trout in a 6–2 Cleveland defeat. He started at catcher again the following day, and went one for two, with another double (off Tommy Bridges). But, although he was the Indians' most-used catcher (playing ahead of rookie and eventual Cleveland stalwart Jim Hegan and veteran Gene Desautels), Denning's production declined as the season wore on. He batted only .210 in 92 games, and, in  he served as the Indians' reserve first baseman (backing up Mickey Rocco) through June 4, when he returned to the minor leagues for the remainder of his on-field career.

In the Majors, Denning collected 76 hits, with 20 doubles and one home run, struck on May 4, 1942, at Fenway Park off Dick Newsome of the Boston Red Sox. He became a player-manager in the minors in 1948 in the Chicago White Sox organization, retiring as an active player in 1950 before spending a final season, 1951, as a non-playing skipper.

Personal
Denning was the uncle of outfielder Chris Bourjos and great-uncle of outfielder Peter Bourjos.

Sources

External links

1912 births
1992 deaths
Baseball players from Chicago
Baseball players from Kansas
Buffalo Bisons (minor league) players
Colorado Springs Sky Sox managers
Cleveland Indians players
Elmira Colonels players
Davenport Blue Sox players
Louisville Colonels (minor league) players
Major League Baseball catchers
Major League Baseball first basemen
Milwaukee Brewers (minor league) players
Minneapolis Millers (baseball) players
Pensacola Fliers players
Toronto Maple Leafs (International League) players
Waterloo White Hawks players
People from Hays, Kansas